Ptyongnathosia palliorana is a species of moth of the family Tortricidae. It is found in Peru.

The wingspan is about 20 mm. The ground colour of the forewings is cream with ochreous-brownish admixture and with brownish dots and traces of markings. The hindwings are cream, somewhat tinged brownish in the apex area and dotted with greyish brown.

Etymology
The species name refers to the small size of the species in comparison with Ptyongnathosia lativalva.

References

Moths described in 2010
Euliini